Civility may denote orderly behavior and politeness. Historically, civility also meant training in the humanities.

Etymology 

Late Middle English: from Old French civilite, from Latin civilitas, from civilis 'relating to citizens' (see civil). In early use, the term denoted the state of being a citizen and hence good citizenship or orderly behavior. The sense 'politeness' arose in the mid-16th century.

Developmental model

Adolf G. Gundersen and Suzanne Goodney Lea have developed a civility model grounded in empirical data that "stresses the notion that civility is a sequence, not a single thing or set of things". The model conceives of civility as a continuum or scale consisting of increasingly demanding traits ranging from "indifference" to "commentary", "conversation", "co-exploration" and, from there, to "habituation". According to the authors, such a developmental model has several distinct advantages, not least of which is that it allows civility to be viewed as something everyone can get better at.

Empathy in Civility
Many experts on civility cite that civility actually goes beyond good manners and listening attentively, but actually includes sharing our own beliefs and values with others through some type of engagement with the intent of sincere respect towards one another. This also requires a willingness and open mindedness to having our opinions and biases challenged by others who share a different and perhaps completely unique perspectives and points of view. Experts say that our ability to act with civility is deeply connected with our ability to understand our own emotions, because understanding our own feelings will help us to recognize how we are feeling in real-time and give us a greater ability to have empathy for others. Furthermore, understanding our own personal feelings can help us to evaluate the things that trigger us emotionally and therefore become more aware and in tune with how we can, could and will possibly react and feel in certain situations. By being open to taking the time to understand our thoughts and emotions in these situations, this practice can lead to the self-recognition and acceptance of how the same or similar situations may affect others, including those that may share a completely unique perspective.
Reverend Dr. Sharon Styles-Anderson was recently recognized by the National Archives for establishing Emotional Civility Day on March 6.  Emotional Civility, a concept developed by Dr. Anderson, was established to help the world recognize that there is a connection between the way we feel, and the way we interact with others.

Lack of civility

Incivility is the polar opposite of civility, or in other words a lack or completely without civility. Verbal or physical attacks on others, cyber bullying, rudeness, religious intolerance, discrimination, and vandalism are just some of the acts that are generally considered acts of incivility. Incivility is a negative part of society that has impacted many people in the United States, but as the world is becoming increasingly more transparent in social interactions, it has become more increasingly apparent that incivility has become an issue on the global stage. Social media and the web have given people the ability around the globe to freely exchange ideas, but it has not come without its consequences.

Politicians in the U.S. have frequently cited that they encounter a lack of civility in their workplace, and have disregarded it as unfortunate aspect of politics, but polls indicate that "going negative" can help candidates win elections. During the 2016 presidential campaign, candidate Donald Trump has regularly called his rivals "stupid, incompetent and losers".

Recognizing that people harassing others online has become a problem and can have negative consequences for businesses, many companies have stepped up to create more awareness and initiatives to help. Intel in collaboration with organizations such as the Born This Way Foundation and Vox Media have made an initiative called "Hack Harassment" aimed to increase awareness of online harassment and anti-harassment technologies. As of 2016 the Data & Society/CiPHR Measuring Cyberabuse poll indicated that nearly 70% of people between the ages of 15 to 29 are harassed or abused online. Although there are many tactics to block cyber-bullying, such as censorship and banning users from accessing a site, it does not correct the underlying issues on what causes it in the first place. Although blocking people online from bullying others may solve some of the issues on the web, 75% of technology professionals believe a universal code of online conduct would also help curb online harassment.

On April 22, 2016, The Associated Press-NORC Center for Public Affairs Research at the University of Chicago released a report citing that 74 percent of Americans think manners and behavior have declined in the United States. In this study they discovered that people in most cases can agree with what is appropriate and inappropriate behavior. They found that 8 out of 10 Americans find jokes made based on race, gender, or sexuality are considered inappropriate, but only a small number of people owning up to actually making these types of jokes ever. Although there were some differences between age demographics on newer technologies, such as the use of cell phones. The report suggests that nearly half of all Americans 18-29 find it acceptable to use their cell phones in a restaurant, while less than 22 percent of people over the age of 60 years old agrees.

Movements to foster civility

Worldwide

The International Day of Peace ("Peace Day") is observed by many countries on September 21. Peace day was first started in 1981 by declaration of the United Nations General Assembly. The voting was overwhelmingly in favor of enacting Peace Day, and so the observance was thus born. The goal of Peace Day is to help bring the world together, and share a collective attitude of peace and harmony. Many countries around the world celebrate September 21 as a day of non-violence and cease-fires to emulate the mission of global peace. Since its beginnings the day has spread more throughout the world, with many countries annually participating in this observance.

Participation is open to all people of the world. People may choose to celebrate Peace Day in different ways, but the goal is to have peace at the heart of all the activity's intentions. Individuals, businesses and organizations are also welcome and encouraged to celebrate Peace Day. Spreading peace and good will towards all mankind is the great aim that's in view for raising awareness for Peace Day.

In May 2007, the Global Peace Index (GPI) was launched in an attempt to measure the relative ranking of peacefulness around different countries around the world. Today, the Global Peace Index is maintained the Institute for Economics and Peace, and is conducted on an annual basis. The index primarily measures three different categories to determine the level of peace in the world. These levels look at the overall security, crime levels, and the build up of military forces. By measuring levels of peace, the hope is that a greater general awareness and attention is given towards making the world a more peaceful place.

In October 2019, the United Nations announced that the World Civility Index would be a part of their Sustainable Development Goals (SDGs). The new Sustainable Development Goals initiative, actually serves as the updated global targets that were set forth initially in the Millennium Development Goals (MDGs) of 2000 to 2015. Under the Sustainable Development Goals initiatives, the United Nations has identified seventeen core challenges that all have an interconnected part in achieving a more sustainable future for all.  One of these Sustainable Developmental goals is labeled as Goal #8. Along with the other goals announced by the United Nations global partners in the Sustainable Development Goals for 2015 to 2030, Goal #8 seeks to end the gaps in education, employment and training for young people by creating meaningful and long-term employment for young people around the world. The World Civility Index is designed to be implemented as a tool for employers and organizations around the world to create a system of consistent measurements of soft skills that are related to civility. Other global organizations, like the Worldwide Civility Council, also aim centralize civility resources and tools, such as the Civility Scorecard and Masonic Family Civility Project, in order to help promote civility and assist various civility organizations around the world. One of the core ideas promoted by the United Nation's goal on achieving worldwide civility is having a universal system for measuring civility, because setting a standard of measurement helps to more accurately measure levels of civility. Furthermore, having meaningful measurements will help light the way for creating more effective and efficient training to aide and assist people in acquiring the soft skills needed, like civility, in the modern workplace and foreseeable future.

In 2020, the Worldwide Civility Council launched the Certified Civil initiative to recognize and validate the commitment to civil behavior and communication by individuals, organizations and groups around the world, which also includes but is not limited to businesses, publications, websites, and social media sites too. A Certified Civil designation can only be awarded based on a demonstrated ability to act and foster civility. At the core of the civility certification process are several commitments, including advocating for dignity and respect in all dealings, listening to create constructive dialogues, speaking in a manner that reflects respect, ensuring all public content is within bounds defined by the Certified Civil standards, displaying the Certified Civil logo, and maintaining good standing through continuous certification.

In the United States

Opinion polls

A 2010 Allegheny College poll found that nearly all Americans (95 percent) believe civility is important in politics.

In a 2012 poll conducted by Weber Shandwick, 65% of Americans reported an increase in incivility due to a weakened U.S. economy during the Great Recession. Almost 50% of those same Americans surveyed indicated they have removed themselves from participating in any politics because of fear of incivility or bullying. Of the 1000 people surveyed, a follow-up study revealed that 86% of those people reported being subjected to incivility. In this report, a part of an annual follow-up research report in January 2016 sharing findings on attitudes and sentiment about civility, 95% of Americans believe that incivility is a very visible issue, while 74% recognized that civility in general had declined during the past few years. Over 90% of voters claimed that the presidential candidates' attitudes and civil behavior would play a significant role in their voting decision in the upcoming 2016 election.

In poll conducted by Georgetown University in 2019, 88% of Americans polled agree about having expressed concern and frustration about uncivil and rude behavior of many politicians. 87% said they are "tired of leaders compromising their values and ideals, while 80% of those same Americans want both "compromise and common ground" as well as leaders who "will stand up for the other side".

In government
Many projects are led by State Supreme Courts to foster civility. One of these initiatives is led by the California Judicial Branch for their Civics Education Outreach program. The primary objective of this program is to teach young adults and students how democracy is supposed to function in the United States and other details about how legal processes work. The mission is to have students leave the program with a greater interest and understanding of U.S. courts, legal processes, and democracy.

In the legal profession
Penn State University conducted a study on perceptions of the legal professional and its relation to civility. They found that general opinion pointed to a drop or decline in civility with the legal profession. To counteract demeaning and unprofessional behavior, there has been several initiatives put in place by state bar associations. However, the legal profession is not the only industry that has adopted civility standards. Many other companies and organizations across several industries have adopted civility standards that have also help to increase workplace civility.

In schools
Numerous universities in the U.S., such as the University of Colorado, the University of Missouri, University of California Davis, Johns Hopkins University, University of Wisconsin, Rutgers University, American University, and California State University San Marcos have created programs designed to foster and define what civility means on their campuses. The Center on Civility & Democratic Engagement at University of California, Berkeley's Goldman School of Public Policy 
recognizes that public dialogue often lacks civility and focuses on preparing current and future leaders to successfully engage people of diverse perspectives in finding solutions for pressing public policy issues. Some colleges, such as the Arizona State University, offer an undergraduate certificate in Civil Communication. Still other universities, such as Kansas State University, have developed programs in dialogue and deliberation which involve codes of behavior that foster constructive, civil discourse. Although many colleges have adopted programs to foster civility efforts, there are still many colleges and universities, including many of the Ivy League schools, that do not have or list no visible place online about any civility initiatives, codes or standards.

In the community
Numerous community groups have formed throughout the U.S. to restore constructive civility in the public space. The Civility Toolkit with approximately 300 civility tools aggregated by the Civility Center with a mission to help provide access to resources regarding civility and to help restore civility in society. Many of these groups are members of the National Coalition for Dialogue and Deliberation. Other programs like iCivics, which was started by American Supreme Court Justice Sandra Day O'Connor, provides educational tools for students that teach about the importance of actively taking part in democracy. Although some private schools offer courses geared to teach about the U.S. government and legal system, most public schools do not teach about the U.S. government until their junior or senior year in high school. To help bring these lessons into the classroom, O'Conner's program provides teachers with educational tools, such as printable goals, games, and various lesson plans.

Arnett and Arneson define civility "a metaphor that points to the importance of public respect in interpersonal interaction." The difference between tolerating someone, and respecting them are concerned with the outlook that toleration does not imply respect, but respect requires understanding of another person's perspective. Having social intelligence or "Social IQ" impacts our ability to empathize with people, and realize all people are human and that if respect or common ground cannot be met that we strive for at least toleration in order to be civil.

In Psychology Today, Price-Mitchell describes civility as a personal attitude that acknowledges other humans' rights to live and coexist together in a manner that does not harm others. The Psychology of civility indicates awareness, ability to control oneself's passions, as well as have a deeper understanding of others are a part of civil obligation, which everyone should strive to participate. This may suggest that civility goes beyond mere toleration, but may inherently imply a mutual co-existence and respect for humankind. Some may relate this to the ideas expressed by singer John Lennon in the song "Imagine", with the words "Imagine all the people sharing all the world." Although the level of peace can be a subjective topic, many people would agree that it requires a certain degree of harmony and opposes violence in order to remain civil.

In the academic journal Philosophy & Public Affairs, Calhoun delineates civility as an element of dialogue that sheds light on "basic moral attitudes of respect, tolerance, and considerateness". The topic of civility is expansive, and can be viewed from many different perspectives. Calhoun considers civility to be a part of the moral virtues that can differ from what is socially acceptable, since what is socially acceptable is not always morally correct.

In the Washington Post, Peter Wehner, author and former deputy director of speechwriting for President George W. Bush, expressed three central points on how civility makes society function and noble. The first of these points illustrates that civility is what holds our families, communities, conversations, and establishments together. In other words, civility is a strong force that enables civic cohesion and eliminates excuses for invective conversations or conflict. Wehner's second point suggests that civility is also an expression of a work of divine art and respect for all human beings. In some ways this concept mirrors the words written in the United States Declaration of Independence on Life, Liberty and the pursuit of Happiness in that all people are worthy of the  inherent and unalienable respect of human dignity. The third point made by Wehner is that civility is an expression of epistemological humility where truth is not relative, but suggests that truth can cover a more widely spread understanding than what is preconceived or imagined.

The Smithsonian coordinated with Olúfémi O. Táíwò, assistant professor of political philosophy and ethics at Georgetown University, to host a virtual Zoom meeting to discuss the important role that civility has played in the pursuit of social justice. The premise of the special presentation is to outline that civility has seemed to have declined within the recent years by increasing political and social polarization coupled with simplistic mass communication systems. Additionally, Táíwò examines social norms, like the formal female adult address of calling a woman "Ms.", as well as, emerging norms of social etiquette that could encourage people to think and ask others about their pronouns. Hosting community events around civility can help lead to interesting conversations and help to broaden perspectives, and as Táíwò points out, how civility will continue to play an important role of how justice for all will be shaped in the future.

Masons and Civility
The Freemasons and members of the entire Masonic family, have had a long history of fostering civil dialogue and building civil societies. Masonic Lodges represent a peaceful assembly of people that are of different places of origin, languages, backgrounds, and beliefs. In particular, the principles and tenets of Freemasonry's values aim to promote and restore civility in the United States and around the globe. In 2015, Grand Master Charvonia of the Grand Lodge of California declared May 25, 2015 to be the "Champion Civility Month", which encouraged Freemasons throughout California to make an effort to bring more civility into their local lodges and community. Additionally, Freemasons from around the world have been working to repair civility through the Masonic Family Civility Project. This Civility Project was built to help raise awareness of Civility, and by providing social conversations, civility resources, multimedia education, and information for anyone to access.

On April 30 to May 1 of 2019, an Urgency of Civility Conference was hosted in Washington D.C. at the George Washington Masonic National Memorial on the 230th anniversary of the United States' first President, George Washington, Inaugural Address. Civility experts convened at the conference to discuss civility in arenas of government, education, media, community and the workplace. During the conference, Congressman Emanuel Cleaver II made a special presentation in recognition of Mrs. Virginia Forni and her late husband, Dr. P.M. Forni, for their efforts on the Johns Hopkins Civility Initiative. Over the course of the two-day civility conference, advocates of civility shared their thoughts, ideas, and efforts to promote civility in various sectors. It became clear that each of these groups could make a positive difference through collaborative efforts and coming together to focus on projects to inspire civility. Further discussions revealed that definition of civility can be defined in many ways, but the key takeaway was the importance of restoring civility has never been more significant. Attendees worked together to form action items required to help further civility initiatives, including innovative thinking, engaging the community, and maintaining steadfast persistence.

In the workplace

Recent studies and polls from 2014 indicate that Americans find workplace incivility to be a growing problem that has had a negative impact on them and their duties at work. One study's research suggests 60% of employees think that their co-workers' irritating habits to have negatively affected them at their job. In the same study, 40% reported that they are looking for another job opportunity because of another negative co-worker. These studies suggest that incivility in the workplace dampens productivity and an adverse effect on an organization's bottom line. Although this data is only looking to quantify how widespread workplace incivility is in the workplace, it does not account for how many people encounter workplace incivility and are not sure what they can do about it. Furthermore, it is not taking into consideration how many of these workplaces have civility tools or initiatives at the researched companies.

Numerous organizations, including the United States government, have actively attempted to put in place measures to prevent incivility in the workforce. One measure that was initiated to reduce workplace incivility, was processing cases of sexual harassment to be illegal, which is defined by the US Equal Employment Opportunity Commission (EEOC) as being against the law in every state to harass any person during the employment or hiring process because of that person's gender. Harassment can include "sexual harassment", but is not limited to workplace bullying, cyber bullying, physical and verbal threats. Although many would agree that sexual harassment is an issue that should be illegal, it has really been in the spotlight of the attention in the U.S. since 1964. Because of the legal ramifications from poor prior classification of sexual harassment cases in the past, its boundaries were more loosely interpreted and more people were subject to unwanted contact or attention. Since this the term has been redefined, people are greater protected from a legal perspective in their place of work, but must actively participate in preventing these issues by speaking up and/or reporting issues. The definition for these laws are still being written today, as more people are speaking out against the abuse.

Organizational Behavior

Human Resource managers are becoming increasingly more aware of the effects of social behavior in the workplace. Inappropriate workplace behavior has led HR personnel to pay more attention to problems arising from incivility, bullying, and abusive supervision within organizations. Research has concluded that incivility can have a negative impact of organizational behavior, including: decreased satisfaction, reduced job performance, increased perceptions of injustice, increased depression, and can lead to employees to experience psychological withdrawal.

More organizations are getting involved in improving their workplaces by reducing incident rates and limiting liability. Some companies are offering their employees civility training specifically geared to foster civility by facilitating conversations about it and enforcing the reduction of incivility on a perpetual basis. Research has indicated that civility training has shown a positive increase in respect, job satisfaction, overall trust, while effects of incivility, cynicism, and employee absenteeism decreased. The results of the research suggests civility training can improve the overall workplace climate, foster a culture of positive behaviors, and minimize workplace issues.

In Canada

In July 2012, the President of the Federation of Law Societies of Canada made a strong point on civility at the 5th Biennial International Legal Ethics Conference. Legislation is often very open for interpretation, unless strictly and prohibitively defined by law, but in most cases where the law is yet to be defined many lawyers can see opportunity to act immorally to win their case. The "anything to get the job done" mentality can not only have negative consequences in the legal system, but it could possibly further spread the potential for laws and regulations to be exploited in immoral manner.

Additionally, during 2012, the Law Society of Upper Canada decided that Joe Groia was guilty of his incivility to opposing counsel during his successful defense of John Felderhof from Insider trading and securities charges. On the same case, the Supreme Court of Canada confirmed the decision of Bar of Quebec that Giles Dore was guilty of professional misconduct because of an uncivil letter he wrote to a judge. This high-profile case brought a lot of attention to the legal definition of the word civility, and what it means to be civil in the legal profession. It has since defined a broader set of rules of what is legally considered civil in the court of law in Canada.

Since the case with Joe Groia, The Law Society of Upper Canada has launched several initiatives to guard against incivility in the Canadian legal profession. To enforce The Law Society's stance on the issues of civility in the Canadian legal system, they have issued verbal warnings to lawyers who are not civil with judges and other lawyers. The counter argument against civility measures in if the new guidelines inhibit their ability to defend their clients. Since laws and rules are often open to interpretation, some lawyers consider it a conflict of interest to be civil with their opponents as they do not believe there is any way to accomplish their goals while remaining civil.

In January 2017, the BC & Yukon Freemasons in Canada stated civility being like The Golden Rule, defined as "treating others as you would want them to treat you". This statement was in part to a recent civility initiative grounded in respect and attitude of inclusiveness with family, community, and the society at large.

In New Zealand

At a recent address with Gisborne's top businesswomen in early 2016, Lara Meyer an adviser to the Australian Government cited incivility in the workplace has cost New Zealand approximately $15 Million a year. Noting that Australia is also losing out about $26 Million a year due to a lack of workplace civility. There could even potentially be more loss that is unaccounted for in New Zealand businesses, as the cost of rudeness could be holding them back from working together more politely and agreeably.

In Hungary
Civil Összefogás Fórum (Civil Cooperation Forum), founded on April 5, 2009, is a kind of umbrella organisation for numerous community groups throughout Hungary.

Famous Quotes on Civility
 "So let us begin anew--remembering on both sides that civility is not a sign of weakness, and sincerity is always subject to proof. Let us never negotiate out of fear. But let us never fear to negotiate." - John F. Kennedy 
 "Civility does not here mean the mere outward gentleness of speech cultivated for the occasion, but an inborn gentleness and desire to do the opponent good." - Mohandas K. Gandhi  
 "Civility costs nothing and buys you everything" - Lady Mary Worley Montague 
 "If a man continually blusters, if he lacks civility, a big stick will not save him from trouble, and neither will speaking softly avail, if back of the softness there does not lie strength, power." - Theodore Roosevelt  
 "Civility also requires relearning how to disagree without being disagreeable... surely you can question my policies without questioning my faith." - Barack Obama

See also

 Etiquette
 Incivility

References

Further reading
 Benet Davetian, Civility: A Cultural History, University of Toronto Press, 2009, 
 Eiko Ikegami, Bonds of Civility, February 2005, 
 Digby Anderson, editor (1996) Gentility Recalled: Mere Manners and the Making of Social Order, May 1996, 
 Elijah Anderson, The Cosmospolitan Canopy: Race and Civility in Everyday Life, February 28, 2012, 
 George Washington, Rules of Civility & Decent Behavior in Company and Conversation
 Godfrey Harris, Civility: How It Fosters Better Communities, Jun 2003, 
 John Perkins, Restoring At-Risk Communities: Doing It Together and Doing It Right, Nov 1 2011, 
 Kent Roberts & Jay Newman, Bring a Dish to Pass: The Civil Action of Community Improvement, 2001
 Mark Kingwell, Unruly Voices: Essays on Democracy, Civility and the Human Imagination, September 11, 2012, 
 Os Guinness, The Case for Civility: And Why Our Future Depends on It, January 22, 2008, 
 P. M. Forni. Choosing Civility: The 25 Rules of Considerate Conduct
 P. M. Forni. The Civility Solution: What to Do When People Are Rude
 P. M. Forni. Choosing Civility: The Twenty-five Rules of Considerate Conduct, St. Martin's Press, 2002, 
 Paul A. Elsner and George R. Boggs, Encouraging Civility as a Community College Leader
 Rules of Civility: The 110 Precepts That Guided Our First President in War and Peace
 Stephen Carter, Civility, Feb 13 1999, 
 Stephen L. Carter (1998) Civility: Manners, Morals, and the Etiquette of Democracy, Basic Books, 1998, 
 T.S. Bogorad. The Importance of Civility
 Walter Earl Fluker, Ethical Leadership: The Quest For Character, Civility, and Community, Feb 1 2009,

External links

Etiquette
Habits
Popular culture